Richard Richardson J.P., (c.1825 – 22 September 1913) was a politician in colonial Victoria (Australia), member of the Victorian Legislative Assembly.

Richardson was born in the Tyneside district, England, and have embraced the profession of a civil engineer, he went to Victoria in 1852, and was for some time in the Roads and Bridges department of the Government service. After spending a year or two in Sydney, he, in 1854, settled as a farmer in the Creswick district of Victoria. In 1874 he entered the Assembly as a member for the Electoral district of Creswick, and held the seat till 1886 when he was defeated at the general election. He was, however, re-elected when the district was resized to a single-member electorate in 1889. Mr. Richardson, who was a Liberal and Protectionist, was Minister of Lands and Agriculture in the third Graham Berry Government from August 1880 to July 1881.

Richardson died in Newlyn, Victoria.

References

1825 births
1913 deaths
Members of the Victorian Legislative Assembly
Victorian Ministers for Agriculture